Mixed 3 m springboard synchro event at the 2019 European Diving Championships was contested on 6 August.

Results
Eight pairs of athletes participated at the single-round event.

References

M